Here is the seventh original album by the English singer-songwriter, Leo Sayer, and was released in 1979.

Track listing

Side one
"The World Has Changed" (Leo Sayer, Billy Livsey, Sergio Cuevas) – 3:54
"When the Money Runs Out" (Sayer, Ray Parker Jr.) – 3:39
"The End" (Sayer, David Courtney) – 3:52
"Lost Control" (Al Kooper) – 4:30
"An Englishman in the U.S.A." (Sayer, Les Davidson) – 4:40

Side two
"Who Will the Next Fool Be" (Sayer, David Courtney) – 4:15
"Work" (Sayer, Tom Snow, Johnny Vastano) – 3:31
"Oh Girl" (Eugene Record) – 3:47
"Ghosts" (Sayer, Frank Farrell, Les Nicol) – 4:29
"Takin' the Easy Way Out" (Sayer, David Courtney) – 4:48

Personnel
Leo Sayer – guitar, harmonica, vocals
John Barnes – keyboards
Jeff Baxter – guitar
Michael Boddicker – synthesizer
Arnell Carmichael – vocals, background vocals
David Courtney – piano, tambourine
Steve Cropper – guitar
Paulinho Da Costa – percussion
Chris Desmond – finger snaps
Mark Doyle – guitar
Donald Dunn – bass guitar
Victor Feldman – percussion
Bob Glaub – bass guitar
Ed Greene – drums
Bobbye Hall – percussion
Mitch Holder – guitar
Jerry Jumonville – saxophone
Al Kooper – organ, synthesizer, keyboards, performer
Billy Livsey – piano, keyboards, Wurlitzer
David Luell – saxophone, tenor saxophone
Steve Lukather – guitar
Steve Madaio – trumpet, flugelhorn, horn
Bill Payne – organ, synthesizer, keyboards
Chuck Rainey – bass guitar
Eugene Record – performer
Rick Shlosser – drums
Tom Snow – piano
James Stroud – Fairlight CMI programming, synthesizers, drums
Fred Tackett – guitar

Charts

References

External links
 

1979 albums
Leo Sayer albums
Chrysalis Records albums
Warner Records albums
Albums recorded at Sunset Sound Recorders